The vice president of Ecuador is the second highest political position in Ecuador. In many instances, the vice president succeeded the president in turbulent political situations. The last time was in 2005 after the resignation of president Lucio Gutiérrez. According to the current constitution, the vice president is elected on the same ticket as the president. Salary of the vice president is 4,869 USD per month.

The current vice president is Alfredo Borrero since May 24, 2021. He was elected in 2021.

Below is the history of the office holders.

List

See also
List of current vice presidents

References

Government of Ecuador
Ecuador
 
1830 establishments in Ecuador